Al Ubaylah is a settlement about 150 miles (250 km) southeast of the town of Yabrin in the Eastern Region in Saudi Arabia. Petroleum in exploitable quantities was not found here in the 1950s by Aramco according to the USGS.

References

Geography of Saudi Arabia
Populated places in Eastern Province, Saudi Arabia